North Bengal International Gold Cup is an biennial international club football tournament held in Bangladesh. The inaugural edition will take place in 2022. It is hosted by the FC Uttor Bongo and under overall supervision Centre for Bangladesh India Friendship. The tournament matches will held in six venues at the Northern cities of Bangladesh.

History
North Bengal International Gold Cup is a international club competition between teams Bangladesh and India which organized by FC Uttor Bongo and Bangladesh Football Federation (BFF). There are six clubs from two countries will contest in the cup.

Participants clubs

Cup winners and finalists

Statistics by club

Top goalscorers by edition

Awards

Player of the Tournament

References

Football competitions in Bangladesh
Football cup competitions in Bangladesh
2022 in Bangladeshi football